This is a list of Cachaça brands. Cachaça is a Brazilian spirit distilled from sugarcane. It has been produced since the 16th century and is the third most consumed distillate in the world by volume, most commonly used to make caipirinhas outside Brazil, but in Brazil, the versatility of this spirit count today thousands of cocktails in its list, used to twist traditional cocktails, or boost new tropical cocktails list.

Wide-distribution cachaças produced and bottled in Brazil
Cauchaça Carvalho, São Paulo, Ilhéus 42% - https://maisdocacau.com.br/
Cachaça Única São Paulo 40% - http://www.tabernadocedro.com.br
Cachaça 51, São Paulo, 38.0%
Cachaça 61, São Paulo, 40%
Cachaça Pitú, Pernambuco, 39.0%
Cachaça Velho Barreiro, São Paulo, 39.0%
Cachaça Ypioca, Ceará, 40.0%
Caninha da Roça, São Paulo, 39.0%
Chapéu de Palha, São Paulo, 39.0%
Cachaça Sagatiba Pura, São Paulo, 38.0%
Cachaça Três Muínho, Minas Gerais, 42.0%
Cachaça Pinissilina, Minas Gerais, 46.0%
Cachaça Jamel Branca, São Paulo, 39.0% - https://www.jamel.com.br/
Cachaça Jamel Ouro, São Paulo, 39.0% - https://www.jamel.com.br/

Small batch or artisan cachaças produced and bottled in Brazil
ABOUT Brazil, 40%
Beija Cachaça
Boca Loca Cachaça
Cachaça Agatão, Ouro Preto, Minas Gerais, 50%
Cachaça Balsa Velha, Cotipora, Rio Grande do Sul, 38%
Cachaça Bartolomeu, 40% - http://www.cachacabartolomeu.com
Cachaça Bayu, Pirassununga, 42.0%
Cachaça Casa Buco, Bento Goncalves, Rio Grande do Sul 40%
Cachaça Bento Albino, Armando de Abreu & Cia Ltda., Rio Grande do Sul, 40% – http://www.bentoalbino.com.br
Cachaça Bento Velho, Minas Gerais, 42.0%
Cachaça Cabana, São Paulo, 40.0%
Cachaça Cachoeira, Minas Gerais, 40.0%
Cachaça Carvalheira, Recife, 40.0%
Cachaça Chico Mineiro, Minas Gerais, 42.0% - http://www.cachacachicomineiro.com.br
Cachaça Claudionor, Minas Gerais, 45.0%
 Cachaça Companheira, Parana, 40.0%
Cachaça Coqueiro, Rio de Janeiro, 44.0%
Cachaça Colinas do Sul, Minas Gerais, 40.0% – http://www.colinasdosul.com
Cachaça Curandeira do Bosco, Paraiba, 42.0%
Cachaça Dom Bueno, Santa Catarina, 42% - http://www.dombueno.com
Cachaça Don Diego, Destilaria Bullhof, Serra Negra, São Paulo, 39%
Cachaça Da Mata, Espírito Santo, 48.0%, 44.0%, 40.0%
Cachaça Engenho Água Doce, Pernambuco, 40%
Cachaça Engenho da Vertente, Santo Antônio do Jardim, São Paulo, 43,5% - http://www.engenhodavertente.com.br
Cachaça Engenho Bahia, Bahia, 41%
Cachaça Espírito de Minas, São Tiago, Minas Gerais, 43.0%
Cachaça Gabriela, São Paulo, 38.0%
Cachaça Germana, Minas Gerais, 43.0%
Cachaça Guapiara, Minas Gerais, 40.0%
Cachaça Itagibá, Bahia, 40.0%
Cachaça Magnífica, Rio de Janeiro, 45.0%
Cachaça Quizumba, São Paulo, 40.0%
Cachaça Sagatiba Velha, Minas Gerais, 38.0%
Cachaça Saturno Premium, Minas Gerais, 38.0%
Cachaça Saturno Premium 3 Years Aged, Minas Gerais, 38.0%
Cachaça Sapucaia Velha,  São Paulo, 40.5%
Cachaça Sanhaçu,  Pernambuco, 40.0%
Cachaça Santo Grau, São Paulo, Minas Gerais, Rio de Janeiro, 40.0%
Cachaca São Paulo, Paraiba, 40.0% - http://www.cachacasp.com/    http://www.engenhosaopaulo.com.br/
Cachaça Terra Forte,  Minas Gerais, 40.0%
Cachaça Três Múinho, Minas Gerais, 42.0%
Cachaça Senzala,  São Paulo, 40.5%
Cachaça Schermann, São Paulo, 38.0%
Cachaça Seleta, Minas Gerais, 43.0%
 Cachaça Vale Verde, Minas Gerais, 40.0%
Cachaça Velha Januária, Minas Gerais, 44.0%
Cachaça Wruck, Santa Catarina, 39.0%
Cachaça Yaguara, Rio Grande do Sul, 42.0%
Chave de Ouro, Ceará, 39.0%
Chico Mineiro, Minas Gerais, 44.0%
DJ Cachaca, Minas Gerais, 40.0%
Leblon Cachaça, Minas Gerais, 40.0%
Maria da Cruz, Minas Gerais, 46.0%
Milagre de Minas, Minas Gerais, 45.0%
São Cachaça, Rio Grande do Sul, 40.0%
Soul Brazilian Premium Cachaca, [São Paulo], 40.0%
Weber Haus Silver Cachaça, Ivoti, Rio Grande do Sul, 38.0%
Weber Haus Premium (Gold) Cachaça, Ivoti, Rio Grande do Sul, 38.0%

Brands created only for the foreign market
 ABOUT Brazil, 40% www.aboutspirits.com
 CapuCana Cachaça (Piracicaba)
 Cachaça Abelha, Chapada Diamantina National Park, Bahia, 39%
Cachaça Avuá, Rio de Janeiro, 42.0%
Agua Luca Cachaça, São Paulo
Aluarez Cachaça Premium, https://www.aluarez.pt
Beleza Pura Cachaça
Beija Cachaça
Brasilla Cachaca
Cachaça HUB, http://www.cachacahub.com/
Cachaça Brazil, 40.0%
Cachaça Fazenda Mãe de Ouro, 40.0%
Cuca Fresca Cachaca, Socorro, SP
Espirito XVI Cachaça, 40,0% - http://www.espiritoxvi.com
Espirito XVI Dourado Aged Cachaça, 47.0%
Frisco Fish Silver Cachaça
Frisco Fish Gold Cachaça
GRM, Araguari, Minas Gerais - http://www.cachacagrm.com.br
Novo Fogo Organic Silver Cachaça
Novo Fogo Aged Gold Cachaça
Rio D Lime Cachaça, 35.0%
Rio D Passion Cachaça, 35.0%
Rio D Premium Cachaça, 40.0%
Soul Brazilian Premium Cachaça, 40.0%
Vogner 40.0%

References

Distilled drinks
Brazilian distilled drinks
Brazilian cuisine-related lists
Alcohol-related lists